"Gone Already" is a song by American recording artist Faith Evans. It was written by Evans, Ryan Toby, Corey "Latif" Williams, Johnathan Smith, Carvin Haggins, and Ivan Barias for her sixth studio album, Something About Faith (2010), with production helmed by Haggins and Barias under their production moniker Carvin & Ivan.

The song was released for digital download on August 10, 2010, serving as the lead single from the album. Evans's first solo release in five years, it managed to peak at number 26 on the Hot R&B/Hip-Hop Songs chart but failed to enter the Billboard Hot 100. "Gone Already" was nominated for Best Female R&B Vocal Performance for the 2011 Grammy Awards.

Critical reception
Described as a "Toni Braxton-worthy breakup ballad" by Andy Kellman of Allmusic, "Gone Already" has received positive critical reception, being cited as one of the "standouts" on Something About Faith. "Gone Already" was nominated for Best Female R&B Vocal Performance in the 2011 Grammy Awards.

Promotion
Evans performed the song live on The Wendy Williams Show on October 8, 2010 and on The Mo'Nique Show on November 12, 2010.

Music video

The music video is available on YouTube.

Chart performance
"Gone Already" peaked at number twenty-six on the US Billboard Hot R&B/Hip-Hop Songs chart, spending a total of seventeen weeks on the chart.

Weekly charts

Year-end charts

References

Faith Evans songs
2010 singles
2010 songs
Songs written by Ryan Toby
Songs written by Ivan Barias
Songs written by Carvin Haggins
Songs written by Faith Evans
Song recordings produced by Carvin & Ivan
MNRK Music Group singles
Contemporary R&B ballads
2010s ballads